The Woodberry-Quarrels House is a historic First Period house in Hamilton, Massachusetts.  The oldest part of this 2.5-story, seven-bay wood-frame house is the central doorway and the rooms to its right, which were built c. 1690 along with a central chimney that was probably removed during Federal-period alterations.  Later in the First Period rooms to the left of the entry were added, and there have been a series of alterations and additions since then.  The First Period core of the house survived the major Federal-era changes, and the house retains much decorative work from that period.

The house was listed on the National Register of Historic Places in 1990.

See also
List of the oldest buildings in the United States
National Register of Historic Places listings in Essex County, Massachusetts

References

Houses completed in 1690
Houses in Hamilton, Massachusetts
Houses on the National Register of Historic Places in Essex County, Massachusetts
1690 establishments in Massachusetts